This is a list of ruling political parties by country, in the form of a table with a link to an overview of political parties in each country and showing which party system is dominant in each country. A political party is a political organization subscribing to a certain ideology or formed around special issues with the aim to participate in power, usually by participating in elections. Individual parties are properly listed in separate articles under each nation.

The ruling party in a parliamentary system is the political party or coalition of the majority in parliament. It generally forms the central government.

Table

A

B

C

D

E

F

G

H

I

J

K

L

M

N

O

P

Q

R

S

T

U

V

W

Y

Z

See also
 List of basic political science topics
 List of current heads of state and government
 List of democracy and elections-related topics
 List of election results
 List of frivolous parties
 List of national leaders
 Lists of political parties by United Nations geoscheme

Notes

References

Ruling
 Ruling Political Parties